V.R.S College of Engineering and Technology is an Engineering college in Ulundurpet, Viluppuram, Tamil Nadu, India.

References

External links
 Official Website

Engineering colleges in Tamil Nadu
Colleges affiliated to Anna University
Education in Viluppuram district
Educational institutions established in 1994
1994 establishments in Tamil Nadu